Iaan Exordium, also known as Iaan Taewha River Exordium, consists of two twin 54-floors,  residential skyscrapers  currently topped-out in Ulsan, South Korea and finishing construction in 2010. They have become the two tallest buildings in South Korea's seventh largest metropolis, Ulsan, becoming the city's new landmark icon.

References

External links
 Official website 

Buildings and structures in Ulsan
Residential buildings completed in 2010